Gustavo Andres Victoria Rave (born May 14, 1980) is a Colombian football player. Originally a playmaker, he was deployed at left back and left midfield for several clubs in Colombia and Turkey.

Club career
He transferred first to Galatasaray in Turkey then played for Gaziantepspor for a season and transferred again to Black Sea side Çaykur Rizespor. He played for them until 2008, except for the year 2005 in which he was loaned to Millonarios. In 2004, he played for Colombia in the 2004 Copa América. His contract with Çaykur Rizespor ended in 2008, and he returned to play in Colombia.

He played for América de Cali in 2009 and for Deportivo Pereira between 2009 and 2012.

Personal life
He and his wife, Paola, both converted to Islam.

References

External links
 
Profile at goal.com 

1980 births
Living people
People from Armenia, Colombia
Colombian footballers
Colombia international footballers
2004 Copa América players
Deportes Quindío footballers
Cortuluá footballers
Deportivo Cali footballers
Galatasaray S.K. footballers
Gaziantepspor footballers
Çaykur Rizespor footballers
Millonarios F.C. players
América de Cali footballers
Deportivo Pereira footballers
Ayacucho FC footballers
Colombian expatriate footballers
Expatriate footballers in Turkey
Expatriate footballers in Peru
Categoría Primera A players
Süper Lig players
Converts to Islam
Colombian Muslims
Association football midfielders